"The Scarlet Tide" is a song written by T-Bone Burnett and Elvis Costello and performed by Alison Krauss from the 2003 film Cold Mountain

According to Costello, Burnett "always said 'Scarlet Tide' was an anti-fear song."

The song was nominated for the Academy Award for Best Original Song and the Grammy Award for Best Song Written for Visual Media.

In 2004, a new version of the song performed by Elvis Costello and Emmylou Harris appeared as the closing track on the Costello album The Delivery Man.

Joan Baez included the song on her 2008 album Day After Tomorrow.

References

External links 
Cold Mountain (soundtrack)

2003 songs
Songs written by Elvis Costello
Songs written by T Bone Burnett
Songs written for films
Song recordings produced by Elvis Costello